Waltheria indica is a species of flowering plant in the mallow family, Malvaceae, that has a pantropical distribution. It is believed to have originated in the Neotropics. Common names include sleepy morning, basora prieta, hierba de soldado, guimauve, mauve-gris, moto-branco, fulutafu, kafaki, and uhaloa (Hawaii). It is most common in dry, disturbed or well-drained, moist habitats. In Puerto Rico, it grows in areas that receive  of annual rainfall and at elevations from sea level to more .

Medicinal uses
The roots, leaves and flowers of W. indica are all used medicinally in some cultures,.

References

External links

Byttnerioideae
Flora of the Caribbean
Pantropical flora
Plants described in 1753
Taxa named by Carl Linnaeus
Ruderal species
Flora without expected TNC conservation status